Herbert Lawrence Becker (born 1951) is an American former magician, escapologist, stunt performer, author, and businessman. As a magician, Becker performed as Kardeen.

Biography

Early life
Herbert Lawrence Becker was born in Hollywood, Florida in 1951.

Magic

Becker performed under the name "The Kardeen Brothers" with Marc Nicols. Later, he worked solo as "The Great Kardeen". He helped open the first Guinness Museums, toured with Guinness on Parade and performed at the Steel Pier and Radio City Music Hall (1976) with the Guinness show. As a magician, Becker toured worldwide until he retired in 1978. Becker appeared as himself (a magician) on the Orlando television program Bozo the Clown appearing weekly and The Maury Povich Show (2001).

In his book All the Secrets of Magic Revealed: The Tricks and Illusions of the World's Greatest Magicians, Becker explained how magicians such as Harry Houdini, David Copperfield, Doug Henning, and Siegfried and Roy created some of their most famous illusions, to the consternation of his colleagues. Becker caused more unhappiness among magicians when he appeared on the television talk show of Maury Povich in March 1997 and exposed the secrets behind such well-known magic tricks as sawing a person in half. Becker has written Magic Secrets and So That's How They Do It.

Business and consulting
Becker served as Chief Executive Officer of Barclay Road, a boutique book publishing house. Becker retired from as CEO on July 2, 2008, but continued as an advisor until the company ceased operations.

Litigation
Becker has been involved in legal disputes with David Copperfield. Copperfield sued Becker in an attempt to prevent publication of All the Secrets of Magic Revealed: The Tricks and Illusions of the World's Greatest Magicians (Lifetime Books, Inc. (March 11, 1997)) which Copperfield maintained revealed some of Copperfield's secrets.   Becker then sued his publisher, Lifetime Books, for purportedly colluding with Copperfield to remove details of Copperfield's illusions.

Books
 101 Greatest Magic Secrets Exposed, Citadel (March 2002); 
 All the Secrets of Magic Revealed: The Tricks and Illusions of the World's Greatest Magicians, Lifetime Books, Inc. (March 11, 1997); 
 More Magic Secrets, Lifetime Books, Inc. January 1997  
 The Art of Retail As Told by the World's Leader in Retail Management and Turn Around Expert 
 John Lennon: Between the Lines, Lifetime Books, Inc. October 1997  
 The magic secrets of David Blaine: The street magician revealed, Lifetime Books, Inc. 2007 (English and French Edition) 
 Magic Hands: Professional Card Trick Secrets Revealed, Cedar Fort, Inc (April 11, 2017)

References 

Living people
American magicians
People from Hollywood, Florida
1951 births